Chain O'Lakes State Park is a  Illinois state park at the inlet of the Fox River into the Chain O'Lakes in Lake and McHenry counties, in the suburban wildlife of Chicago, Illinois, United States.

It is one of the centerpieces of the proposed Hackmatack National Wildlife Refuge.

External links

State parks of Illinois
Protected areas of Lake County, Illinois
Protected areas of McHenry County, Illinois
Protected areas established in 1945
1945 establishments in Illinois